"Love Diary" is the second extended play for the South Korean girl group C-REAL. The album was promoted through the song "JOMA JOMA". The album peaked at #9 on the second week of March in Gaon Weekly Albums Chart while the single landed on #27 in Mnet Music Charts.

Background
C-REAL's second mini-album was produced by the same producer as to their first EP which is Choi Kap Won. The group promoted the song JOMA JOMA, which is included in the album. The teaser was uploaded on March 1, 2012. The full music video was released along with the mini-album on March 7, 2012.

Track listing

Charts

Album charts

Single charts

References

2012 EPs
Korean-language EPs
Kakao M EPs